Chang Kuo Chou (1 February 1906 - 24 August 1975) was a scholar, calligrapher, and is widely considered to be the Father of Pharmaceutical Sciences in Taiwan.

Early life
Chang was born and grew up in Chiayi, near present day Tainan as the second child of LiuBian (劉邊) and JianWei (簡未). He was adopted by ChangWen (張文) and JianGe (江葛) for work in the agriculture fields. Although assigned to farm labor, during his free time Chang showed a keen interest for learning with activities such as writing Chinese characters on the ground.

Education and career

At a time when illiteracy and poverty were common, Chang convinced JiaYi (嘉義), the village elder to subsidize his education in Japan. In 1930, Chang graduated from Japan’s Tokyo University of Pharmacy and Life Sciences and returned to Taiwan to be the country’s first pharmacist. Over the next few years he used compounding techniques and revolutionized medicine by creating a set of powdered formulas that incorporated elements of both western and eastern medicine.  His products are still popular today. Stomachin is Taiwan’s number one selling powdered medicine. His book, Essentials of Pharmacopia 藥典輯要 is still available today.

Calligraphy
Chang Kuo Chou's calligraphy works won many awards including Japanese Calligraphy and Taiwanese Banner (參加「日本書道作振會」之兩件作品分別為楷書〈永成家之光〉條幅及行書〈趙孟頫題董元溪岸圖〉條幅 皆獲得「入選」).

References 

1906 births
1975 deaths
Taiwanese pharmacists
Taiwanese calligraphers